The Batman vs. Dracula is a 2005 American direct-to-video animated superhero-horror film based on The Batman television series. The film is a crossover with the 1897 horror novel Dracula. The film was released to DVD on October 18, 2005, and made its television debut on Cartoon Network's Toonami block on October 22, 2005. In the film, the Batman races to save Gotham City from his most challenging foe yet: the legendary vampire Count Dracula himself, who hatches a plot together to enslave the city and create a race of vampires along with his two new henchmen, the Penguin and the Joker. It was released on DVD as a tie-in with the live action Batman Begins.

Plot
The Joker and the Penguin break out of Arkham, racing to find a stash of stolen money hidden in a crypt at Gotham Cemetery. Joker is quickly intercepted by Batman and is electrocuted when he falls into a river by his super-charged joy buzzers. Penguin enters the cemetery. While searching through a crypt, Penguin accidentally cuts his hand while using his umbrella sword to open a coffin he hopes contains the money, finding a body instead. Blood from his hand drips on the corpse's heart, which brings it to life; it is none other than the vampire king Dracula, his body having been moved from Transylvania to Gotham City after his "death." Penguin is spared from being bitten thanks to a watchman, whom Dracula bites instead; once the watchman revives as a vampire, Dracula hypnotizes Penguin into serving him as his daytime sentinel.

One night, Batman witnesses a vampire attack but decides to put the incident at the back of his mind and, as Bruce Wayne, proceeds to host a corporate party at his manor. Dracula arrives, disguised as cultural anthropologist Dr. "Alucard," claiming to be visiting to study the Batman (believing his legacy influenced Batman's existence), and takes an interest in Vicki Vale, a reporter who is interviewing and dating Bruce. After failing to bite Bruce to quench his thirst, Dracula bites a waiter instead; the new vampire scares Bruce's butler Alfred. Bruce immediately deduces "Alucard" is Dracula, and the disappearances of Gotham citizens, who have been dubbed "Lost Ones" by the media, are because they are being turned into vampires. Due to eyewitnesses claiming to see a bat-like figure during the attacks, it is mistakenly reported Batman is the culprit. When Batman goes to Gotham Cemetery to look for Dracula's nest, he is chased down by a SWAT unit, all of whose members are taken by Dracula as they chase him back into the city. During a fight with Batman, Dracula offers to let him join his conquest of Gotham; Batman refuses. Just as Dracula has the Batman at his mercy, the sun rises, and Dracula is forced to retreat, vowing to kill Batman for rejecting his offer.

At the cemetery, Joker reappears alive and well and confronts Penguin. He asks where the treasure is, thinking Penguin has already found it, chasing him into Dracula's tomb. However, despite Penguin's warning not to open Dracula's coffin, Joker ends up "breakfast in bed, freshly-squeezed" for Dracula, much to Penguin's horror. Joker attacks a blood bank, leading to his capture by Batman. While Batman attempts to concoct an antidote from the Joker's infected cellular structure, Alfred discovers that Dracula once had a vampire bride, Carmilla Karnstein, who was killed by sunlight. However, during his research, Bruce stands up an understanding Vicki, who Dracula soon kidnaps. Finally, the Batman cures the Joker of his vampirism and ascertains the location of Dracula's lair in Gotham Cemetery before returning him to Arkham. He then proceeds to mass-produce the vaccine.

Dracula attempts to sacrifice Vicki's soul to reanimate Carmilla. Upon learning Vicki has been kidnapped, Batman rushes to Dracula's lair with his anti-vampirism vaccine and arsenal of weapons, defeating and curing all the "Lost Ones" that attack him in the catacombs beneath Gotham Cemetery. Batman then frees Vicki, disrupting the reanimation ritual. Dracula sends the Penguin to recapture Vicki while he fights Batman, who lures Dracula into the Batcave, where Batman would have the advantage over the vampire. In an attempt to aid his master, Alfred injects Dracula with the anti-vampirism vaccine, but it cannot cure a natural vampire. When Dracula resumes his pursuit, Batman incinerates him with his prototype solar energy storing machine by striking him with the sunlight stored within, reducing Dracula to a pile of ashes and bones with his remains secured by Alfred. This also frees the Penguin from his control, who, while chasing Vicki, finally finds the hidden treasure that caused all the trouble in the first place. Sadly, he is arrested and blamed for Dracula's kidnappings, causing the media to think he was forcing people to find the treasure. Batman is cleared of all charges, and he resumes protecting Gotham.

Voice cast
 Rino Romano as Bruce Wayne / The Batman
 Peter Stormare as Count Dracula
 Tara Strong as Vicki Vale
 Tom Kenny as Oswald Cobblepot/The Penguin
 Kevin Michael Richardson as The Joker
 Alastair Duncan as Alfred Pennyworth
Additional voices were provided by Jeff Bennett, Richard Green, Neil Ross and James Sie.

Prior Batman/Dracula crossovers
 In the Elseworlds comic book Batman & Dracula: Red Rain by Doug Moench, Kelley Jones, and Malcolm Jones III, Batman encounters Dracula and becomes a vampire to defeat him.
 Batman fought Dracula in the 1964 film Batman Dracula and in the 1967 film Batman Fights Dracula. However, neither of these movies was authorized by DC Comics.
 An early Batman villain, the Monk, was a vampire character who debuted in 1939.
 Batman fought against the vampire Gustav Decobra in Detective Comics #455 (January 1976)

The Batman Strikes #15: "The Lost Ones"
This moody tale, which guest stars the Penguin, serves as a companion piece to The Batman vs. Dracula, and introduces Count Dracula into Gotham City.

Even though the Penguin is under Dracula's control, this does not keep him from tending to his own business. He exploits the missing Gothamites/the Lost Ones by kidnapping citizens and holding them for ransom. He is aided by the Kabuki Twins.

As the issue comes to a close, Batman is about to apprehend the Penguin when he is rescued by Dracula. Dracula does not appreciate the exploitation of his activity and makes sure to keep the Penguin on a tighter leash.

Reception
Critical reaction to The Batman vs. Dracula has been mixed. Maurice Cobbs of DVD Verdict said, "The Batman vs. Dracula was good enough that I wish it had been better, but in the final analysis, the product is exceptionally average. While there are good points to this production, they just aren't plentiful enough to overcome the flaws, and while this may be a spooky and entertaining diversion for the younger set, more mature viewers may be left wanting." Batman-on-Film wrote, "Overall, I enjoyed The Batman vs. Dracula. If you group all the animated Batman movies together, this is one of the better ones. I give it a grade of B- and would tell any Bat-fan to add it to their Bat-DVD collection." The World's Finest Online said, "In the end, the negatives barely register in the grand scale of things. The movie has an excellent story, great dialogue (sans puns), amazing animation, perfect voice actors and a score that keeps up and enhances them all. There’s very little not to like about this film."

Kevin L. Carvell of Cinema Crazed said, "Though incredibly predictable and by the numbers, this is a really good and fun animated action horror combination that picks up the slack with Batman as he's supposed to be while fighting Dracula as he's supposed to be. Stormare approaches the role with enthusiasm making this all the more watchable." The SF, Horror, and Fantasy Film Review wrote, "It feels more like a case of the comic-book canon having been twisted out of shape in order to make it work as a vampire story. The title team-up intrigues one, but you can’t help but think how much more depth and character could have been invested into the effort if The Batman vs. Dracula had been made as part of the Bruce Timm universe."

Cancelled sequel
A sequel titled The Batman vs. Hush that featured Hush as the main villain along with the Joker, the Penguin, the Riddler, Catwoman, and Clayface was planned for a long time. However, the film ended up being scrapped. Before its cancellation, producer Alan Burnett had hopes of making one or two more DTV movies based on The Batman.

References

External links

DC page

The Batman vs. Dracula @ The World's Finest
The Batman vs. Dracula @ BYTB: Batman Yesterday, Today and Beyond
The Batman vs. Dracula at Legions Of Gotham

2005 animated films
American direct-to-video films
2005 direct-to-video films
2000s American animated films
2000s animated superhero films
American vampire films
Animated Batman films
Animated crossover films
Direct-to-video animated films based on DC Comics
Dracula films
Films based on television series
The Batman (TV series)
Films directed by Michael Goguen
Films directed by Seung Eun Kim
Films directed by Sam Liu
Films directed by Brandon Vietti
Toonami
Vampires in animated film
Films with screenplays by Duane Capizzi
2000s English-language films
Warner Bros. direct-to-video films
Warner Bros. direct-to-video animated films